Monte Stella may refer to the following hills or mountains in Italy:

 Monte Stella (Calabria)
 Monte Stella (Cilento)
 Monte Stella (Cuneo)
 Monte Stella (Milan)
 Monte Stella (Salerno)